Brookula spinulata is a species of sea snail, a marine gastropod mollusk unassigned in the superfamily Seguenzioidea.

Description
The maximum recorded size of the shell is 1.54 mm.

Distribution
This species occurs in the Atlantic Ocean off Brazil, found at a depth of 775 m.

References

spinulata
Gastropods described in 2001